Charles Francis Maxwell (November 17, 1916 – August 4, 2004) was an American actor who served as president of the American Federation of Television and Radio Artists from 1984 to 1989.

Life and career
A native of The Bronx borough of New York City, and a graduate of the University of Michigan,
he appeared in 151 films or television programs. Maxwell began his acting career on the Broadway stage, appearing in such notable plays as Death of a Salesman (playing the role of Willy Loman's son, "Happy"), South Pacific (playing "Luther Billis," a role that went to Ray Walston in the film version), and Stalag 17.  His first television acting roles were in 1950 in episodes of the Goodyear Playhouse/Philco Playhouse followed in 1951 by an appearance in the episode "The Overcoat" of the television series Big Town.

Maxwell subsequently appeared in such series as Decoy, with Beverly Garland, Peter Gunn (twice), Alfred Hitchcock Presents (five episodes), The Fugitive (three episodes), Whirlybirds, Black Saddle, The Man and the Challenge, The Deputy, Cain's Hundred, Follow the Sun, Hong Kong, The Asphalt Jungle, Target: The Corruptors, and Mr. Novak. Mission Impossible. He was cast three times each on Robert Montgomery Presents, Cannon, and Emergency! and four times each on Rawhide, Quincy, M.E., and The F.B.I.

In 1960, Maxwell was cast in CBS's science fiction series, The Twilight Zone as Marty Fisher in the episode "A World of Difference". That same year, he appeared as Hackett in the episode "Millionaire Jessica March" of the CBS fantasy drama, The Millionaire. In 1960 he made two guest appearances on Perry Mason: as Harry Wilson in "The Case of the Wayward Wife," and defendant Joe Dixon in "The Case of the Red Riding Boots." He made a third appearance in 1961 as Dr. Mooney in "The Case of the Injured Innocent."

In the 1962–1963 television season, he was a co-star of the ABC sitcom, Our Man Higgins, starring Stanley Holloway in the title role and with Audrey Totter and Ricky Kelman. Maxwell played the father, Duncan MacRoberts, in all thirty-four episodes of the series.  He also appeared as a regular on the TV series "Felony Squad" with Howard Duff from 1966-68 and "The Second Hundred Years" with Monte Markham from 1967-68.

In 1970, he appeared as a producer in “That Girl”.

From 1973 to 1975, he appeared in five episodes of CBS's Barnaby Jones, with Buddy Ebsen. In 1977, he appeared an in episode of ABC's The Feather and Father Gang. In 1984, he appeared in a two-part episode of ABC's The Love Boat, in which he was cast as Colonel Charles Holmsey. His last regular acting role was as Dan Rooney, the lovable aging hospital administrator on General Hospital which he appeared on from 1978-1988. Over the years, the character had a hand in practically every storyline and was a major participant in the now famous "Ice Princess" storyline which dominated the daytime ratings in 1981.

Filmography

References

External links

1916 births
2004 deaths
University of Michigan alumni
American male stage actors
American male television actors
American male film actors
Male actors from New York City
Male actors from Los Angeles
20th-century American male actors
People from the Bronx
Presidents of the American Federation of Television and Radio Artists